Chiang Nai-shin (born 24 September 1948) is a Taiwanese politician. He served in the Taipei City Council from 1982 to 2009, when he was elected to the Legislative Yuan.

Education
Chiang attended Tatung University, where he earned a master's degree in business administration.

Political career
Chiang was elected to the Taipei City Council in 1981 and served until 2009. After Diane Lee resigned her legislative seat in January 2009, Chiang won a four-way primary held on 8 February to represent the Kuomintang in the resulting by-election. He subsequently defeated six other candidates in the by-election held on 28 March.

The Democratic Progressive Party nominated retired baseball player  to run against Chiang in 2012. During his 2016 campaign, Chiang was first opposed by Freddy Lim, a member of the New Power Party, who soon ceded the race to fellow candidate  of the Social Democratic Party. Chiang easily defeated Fan and Minkuotang candidate Wu Hsu-chih.

References

1948 births
Living people
Republic of China politicians from Shanghai
Taipei Members of the Legislative Yuan
Kuomintang Members of the Legislative Yuan in Taiwan
Members of the 7th Legislative Yuan
Members of the 8th Legislative Yuan
Members of the 9th Legislative Yuan
Tatung University alumni
Taiwanese people from Shanghai
Taipei City Councilors